The Irish National Badminton Championships is a tournament organised to crown the best badminton players in Ireland.

The tournament started in 1912.

Past winners

References

External links
Badminton Europe – Details of affiliated national organisations
Ireland - National Championships

Badminton tournaments in Ireland
National badminton championships
Recurring sporting events established in 1912
1912 establishments in Ireland